Puro Amor may refer to:

Puro Amor, album by Dom Salvador 2002
Puro Amor, album by Los Tucanes de Tijuana 2003
Puro Amor, album by Cassiane 1996